The 2001 Galleryfurniture.com Bowl was the second edition of the college football bowl game (renamed the Houston Bowl the following year), and was played at the Reliant Astrodome in Houston, Texas. The game pitted the Texas A&M Aggies from the Big 12 Conference and the TCU Horned Frogs from Conference USA (C-USA). The game was the final competition of the 2001 football season for each team and resulted in a 28–9 Texas A&M victory. The teams were rivals in the Southwest Conference for many years.

Game summary

See also
 TCU–Texas A&M football rivalry

References

Galleryfurniture.com Bowl
Houston Bowl
Texas A&M Aggies football bowl games
TCU Horned Frogs football bowl games
December 2001 sports events in the United States
2001 in sports in Texas
2001 in Houston